WUTQ-FM (100.7 MHz) is a commercial radio station licensed to Utica, New York.  The station serves the Utica-Rome region of New York State. The station is owned by Roser Communications Network and it airs a talk radio format.

The studios and offices are on Leland Avenue in Utica.  The transmitter is on Higby Road in New Hartford.

Programming
Weekdays begin with a local talk and information show, "The Talk of the Town," hosted by Jason Aiello and Rocco LaDuca.  The rest of the schedule is made up of nationally syndicated talk shows, Glenn Beck, Chris Plante, Dan Bongino, Jesse Kelly, Alex Jones and Red Eye Radio.  

Weekends feature shows on money, health, real estate, technology and home repair.  Weekend hosts include Gary Sullivan, Leo Laporte, Ben Shapiro and Bill Cunningham.  WUTQ-FM simulcasts newscasts from NBC Network affiliate Channel 2 WKTV.  Most hours begin with world and national news from Townhall.

History
The station got its construction permit from the Federal Communications Commission in 1989.  It was given the call sign WEIF.  But it took several years for original owner Clara Crocco of Clayville, New York, to put the station on the air.  The station officially signed on the air on July 11, 1994, as WVVC.  It was a Christian radio station, owned by Bethany Broadcasting, with its studios and offices on Higby Road in New Hartford, New York.  (The transmitter remains at that location, even after several ownership changes.)

The station became a K-Love network affiliate in 2001, WVVC was sold to the Educational Media Foundation for $1.25 million. It was the first purchase made by EMF in the state of New York. When the station took the K-Love affiliation, the call letters were changed to WKVU, for K Love Utica.

On December 15, 2010 WRCK swapped frequencies with K-Love-formatted WKVU, with WRCK (and its Air 1 Christian rock format) moving to 100.7 FM and WKVU moving to 107.3 FM.  In November 2011, EMF announced that it would sell WRCK to Roser Communications and move Air 1 to WOKR (93.5 FM), which had previously carried the now-defunct God's Country Radio Network.

On March 16, 2012, Roser took control of the channel and began a simulcast of AM stations WUTQ and WADR, the full-service gold-based adult contemporary stations that had been airing on the station since approximately 2007. WUTQ had previously been relying on an FM translator, W238CA (95.5) in Middleville, New York, for FM coverage. On March 23, the station took the WUTQ-FM call letters, with the WRCK call sign moving to the former WADR 1480 AM.

WUTQ spun off its former AM simulcast stations to Good Guys Broadcasting in July 2012; the stations were shut down in late 2015.

On March 30, 2015, Roser Communications moved the studios of all their stations, including WUTQ-FM, to new facilities located at the Canal Park off Leland Avenue. Prior to this, Roser Communications had been leasing space at the Adirondack Bank building on Genesee Street.

Dave Coombs, former morning host at classic rock WTKW and WOUR, was hired as morning host in August 2015.

On February 27, 2017, after a weekend of stunting with a wide variety of sound clips and snippets of music, WUTQ dropped its soft AC music and became a full-time talk radio station as "Talk! 100.7", becoming the first station in the Utica-Rome area to broadcast FM news-talk. The Talk of the Town, the station's existing morning drive talk show, was retained, with new hosts after Coombs left for another station; also retained were simulcasts of three WKTV television newscasts. Music programming was replaced by syndicated talk shows, including Glenn Beck, Laura Ingraham, Dave Ramsey, America Now with Buck Sexton, Michael Savage, and Red Eye Radio.

References

External links

UTQ-FM
Talk radio stations in the United States
Radio stations established in 1989
1989 establishments in New York (state)